Tomás de Cárdenas, O.P. (died 1578) was a Roman Catholic prelate who served as the third Bishop of Verapaz (1574–1578).

Biography
Tomás de Cárdenas was ordained a priest in the Order of Preachers. On 8 January 1574, he was selected by the King of Spain and confirmed by Pope Gregory XIII as Bishop of Verapaz. He served as Bishop of Verapaz until his death in 1578.

See also
Catholic Church in Guatemala

References

External links and additional sources
 (for Chronology of Bishops) 
 (for Chronology of Bishops) 

1578 deaths
16th-century Roman Catholic bishops in Guatemala
Bishops appointed by Pope Gregory XIII
Dominican bishops
Roman Catholic bishops of Verapaz